The Crawl is an album by pianist Mickey Tucker which was recorded in 1979 and released on the Muse label.

Reception

The Allmusic review awarded the album 3 stars stating "Tucker plays decent piano and outstanding organ, and it's the organ solos and accompaniment that generate the infrequent sparks".

Track listing 
All compositions by Mickey Tucker except as indicated
 "The Crawl" - 6:48  
 "It Could Be, If It Was, But It Ain't" - 7:17  
 "Just a Thought for Love" - 4:05  
 "June Bug, June Bug; Where You Fly?" - 6:05  
 "Pisces Brothers" (Roy Brooks) - 8:35  
 "Marcus Tiberius and the Gladiator" - 4:02

Personnel 
Mickey Tucker - piano
Marcus Belgrave - trumpet, flugelhorn
Slide Hampton - trombone
Junior Cook - tenor saxophone
Ted Dunbar - guitar (track 1)
Earl May - bass
Billy Hart - drums

References 

Mickey Tucker albums
1980 albums
Muse Records albums